Nassim Banouas (born 8 September 1986) is a German retired footballer who played as a defender.

Career 
Banouas previously played for 1. FSV Mainz 05, Sportfreunde Siegen and 1. FC Kaiserslautern before signing with Kickers Offenbach.

Personal life 
His father is Algerian while his mother is German.

References

1986 births
Living people
People from Worms, Germany
Algerian footballers
1. FC Kaiserslautern players
1. FC Kaiserslautern II players
Kickers Offenbach players
Sportfreunde Siegen players
SV Waldhof Mannheim players
FC 08 Homburg players
SV Elversberg players
Wormatia Worms players
German footballers
German people of Algerian descent
German sportspeople of African descent
2. Bundesliga players
3. Liga players
Association football defenders
Footballers from Rhineland-Palatinate